Gary Chan is a cyclist and inventor from Hong Kong and one of the pioneers in making upcycling bicycle in Hong Kong. He was prosecuted by police for riding his self-made solar-powered bicycle in summer 2014 and the case raised criticism of Hong Kong's outmoded traffic laws.

Early life 
Gary Chan showed great creativity in his childhood years and wanted to become a sculptor, but had little aptitude in his academic studies. He performed well in sports when he was studying in Jockey Club Ti-I College. He left school after Form 3 and had a string of jobs in manufacturing and construction.

Inventor career 
He began to create custom bicycles in 2005 using recycled metal and bicycle parts. He learnt welding skills from a metal workshop near his day job.

In August 2014, Chan was arrested while riding a prototype solar-powered bicycle in Kwun Tong after the police had received complaints. The bicycle was confiscated. He was charged with driving an unregistered vehicle and driving without valid insurance. The solar-powered bicycle was confiscated. The court case was heard on 19 September 2014, in which Chan pleaded guilty. He was fined HK$3,000 and his driving licence was suspended for one year.  The case raised public concern about outdated government policies on traffic enforcement and innovation.

Gary Chan and four other bicycle enthusiasts from various disciplines founded Wheel Things Makers in 2015 and established the group's first workshop in To Kwa Wan They participated the first official    Maker Faire as one of the flagship event in October 2015, and further joined E-Maker Faire Hong Kong 2015 (香港造節) in April 2017 as an co-organiser of the 'Large Activities' 'E-Go Kart (我是車手)  in the 2-days event.  One of their exhibits was a wagon powered by a detachable electric drill, which was deliberately designed to mock the police's decision to prosecute Chan the year before.

Participated exhibitions 
Gary Chan participated various exhibitions, art shows, campaigns as well as sharing sessions in Hong Kong.

References

Hong Kong inventors
Hong Kong male cyclists
Living people
Year of birth missing (living people)